Qezel Dagh-e Ajam (also Romanized as Qezel Dāgh-e ‘Ajam and Qezeldāgh-e ‘Ajam) is a village in Chaybasar-e Jonubi Rural District, in the Central District of Maku County, West Azerbaijan Province, Iran. At the 2006 census, its population was 359, in 79 families.

References 

Populated places in Maku County